Massachusetts House of Representatives' 10th Hampden district in the United States is one of 160 legislative districts included in the lower house of the Massachusetts General Court. It covers part of the city of Springfield in Hampden County. Democrat Carlos González of Springfield has represented the district since 2015.

The current district geographic boundary overlaps with those of the Massachusetts Senate's 1st Hampden and Hampshire district and Hampden district.

Representatives
 Geo. Green, circa 1858 
 Addison Gage, circa 1859 
 Charles F. Grosvenor, circa 1888 
 Lawrence F. Dowd, circa 1920 
 Daniel Joseph Bresnahan, circa 1951 
 Theodore J. Trudeau, circa 1975 
 Anthony M. Scibelli
 Cheryl Coakley-Rivera
 Carlos González, 2015-current

See also
 List of Massachusetts House of Representatives elections
 Other Hampden County districts of the Massachusetts House of Representatives: 1st, 2nd, 3rd, 4th, 5th, 6th, 7th, 8th, 9th, 11th, 12th
 Hampden County districts of the Massachusett Senate: Berkshire, Hampshire, Franklin, and Hampden; Hampden; 1st Hampden and Hampshire; 2nd Hampden and Hampshire
 List of Massachusetts General Courts
 List of former districts of the Massachusetts House of Representatives

Images
Portraits of legislators

References

External links
 Ballotpedia
  (State House district information based on U.S. Census Bureau's American Community Survey).
 League of Women Voters of Northampton Area

House
Government of Hampden County, Massachusetts